Whistle Down the Wind is a 1961 British children's crime drama film directed by Bryan Forbes, adapted by Keith Waterhouse and Willis Hall from the 1958 novel of the same name by Mary Hayley Bell. The film stars her daughter Hayley Mills, who was nominated for the BAFTA Award for Best British Actress for this film.

Unusually, almost all the main characters are children; the film attempts to show the world through the eyes of an innocent child.

In 2005, the British Film Institute included it in its list of the 50 films that children should see by the age of 14.

Plot

Three Lancashire farm children discover a bearded fugitive (the Man/Arthur Blakey) hiding in their barn and mistake him for Jesus Christ. They come to this conclusion because of their Sunday School stories and Blakey's shocked exclamation of "Jesus Christ!" when Kathy, the eldest child, accidentally discovers him. In Sunday School the children quiz their teacher and become even more convinced in their belief.

The story spreads to the other children and ten visit him in the barn. While he sits in the hay in a Bethlehem type setting they bring him gifts and kneel as they present them. They ask for a story. They want a Bible story but he reads to them from a newspaper. When two adults appear the children have to leave and Blakey has to hide in the hay. He asks why they are helping and Kathy says "because we love you" and hands him a folded Bible picture of Jesus.

In a playground one boy gets bullied for saying he has seen Jesus. The children watch in dismay as the boy eventually renounces his statement. When Kathy says she has seen him the bully slaps her face.

Blakey—initially confused about why the three Bostock children are eager to protect him from adult discovery—makes no attempt to correct their mistake, especially when he discovers the eldest child, Kathy, is determined to keep him hidden from the local police, despite the posters circulating in the nearby town that reveal he is wanted for murder.

When Blakey lets a kitten die, with no remorse, a doubt is sown in the minds of some of the children. The children quiz the vicar as to why Jesus does not save every person and animal and he says it is so the world does not get crowded.

Blakey sends Kathy to retrieve a package he has hidden. A police manhunt takes place as Kathy searches. She finds the package under a rail in a railway tunnel. This provides Blakey with a revolver.

At Charles' birthday party Nan takes an extra piece of cake and lets slip it is "for Jesus". Charles says it is not Jesus, it is "just a fella."

Kathy's father realises the connection to the missing criminal and the police are called in to apprehend the criminal. The father waits outside the barn with a shotgun.

The children of the village, perhaps 100 of them now in on the secret, converge on the barn. Kathy sneaks behind the barn and passes a pack of cigarettes through a hole, but she has forgotten matches. She says she has not betrayed him, but the police are closing in. He forgives her and, after much prompting from her, promises she will see him again. Resigned to his fate, Blakey tosses his handgun out of the barn door and surrenders to the police.

Blakey stands arms outstretched as he is frisked. His silhouette echoes the crucifixion.

Once Blakey is taken away and the crowd disperses, Kathy is approached by two very young children who ask to see Jesus. She tells them that they missed him this time, but he will be back one day.

Cast
 Hayley Mills as Kathy Bostock
 Bernard Lee as Mr. Bostock
 Alan Bates as Arthur Blakey (Credited as the man)
 Diane Holgate as Nan Bostock
 Alan Barnes as Charles Bostock
 Norman Bird as Eddie
 Diane Clare as the Sunday School Teacher
 Patricia Heneghan as Salvation Army Girl
 John Arnatt as Superintendent Teesdale
 Elsie Wagstaff as Auntie Dorothy
 Hamilton Dyce as the Vicar
 Howard Douglas as the Vet
 Ronald Hines as P.C. Thurstow
 Gerald Sim as Detective Constable Wilcox
 Michael Lees as 1st Civil Defence Worker
 Michael Raghan as 2nd Civil Defence Worker
 May Barton as Villager
 Roy Holder as Jackie
 Barry Dean as Raymond or Patto (the teenage boy who slaps Kathy in the playground)

Production
The novel was published in 1959. Mary Bell based the three children on her own children, including Hayley Mills.

The novel was turned into a stage play. Film rights were bought by Bryan Forbes and Richard Attenborough, who had moved into film production. They were friends of John Mills and Mary Bell and secured Hayley Mills to play the lead. She had just made Pollyanna for Disney.

Forbes was so taken with the material that he wanted to write the script and direct. However the Millses would not approve him. This upset Forbes, who withdrew himself from the project. Attenborough hired Keith Waterhouse and Willis Hall to write the script and Guy Green to direct. It was Waterhouse and Hall who decided to relocate the book's setting from Kent to Lancashire. Weeks before filming was to start Guy Green pulled out of the film, to accept an offer at MGM. Attenborough suggested that Forbes direct, but John Mills and Mary wanted Attenborough to do it. Attenborough had no ambitions towards directing then, and knew how badly Forbes wanted the job so he persuaded the Millses to listen to a pitch from Forbes as to how he would do it. The pitch was successful and they gave their approval.

Alan Bates, in his first starring film role, played the man in the barn. Local schoolchildren from the Lancashire villages around Burnley and Clitheroe were used as extras; children from Chatburn Primary School played the 'disciples'. The theme music by Malcolm Arnold became a classic.

Bryan Forbes put the budget at £161,000, although other sources say it was lower.

The film contrasts the children's innocent faith with the pragmatic and suspicious adults in the town. Heavy in allegory, many of the characters and events parallel those found in historical Christian literature. In one scene, a child is mocked and beaten into denying he had seen Jesus. After the boy's third denial, a train whistle is heard (representing Peter's denial in Luke 22). The strains of 'We Three Kings' can be discerned in the score as Kathy, her brother and sister march with the food 'gifts' they have acquired for the man in the 'stable'. They are spotted and followed by a group of country children (shepherds). The early core of children who are in on the secret number a dozen and are specifically called the Disciples in the film credits. When apprehended, Blakey is immediately frisked by police; his arms outstretched at his sides are a clear reference to the Crucifixion.

In contrast with the children's concerns about Jesus, their local vicar's concerns are earthly. After being interrupted by Kathy in his reading at a café of Gently At The Summit, her parish priest avoids all questions of Christ and turns the tables, accusing the world of stealing church property.

Release
The film had its World Premiere at the Odeon Leicester Square on 20 July 1961. It played there for 3 weeks, ending its run on 9 August, three days after it began its general release in the London area.

Critical reception
The film was favourably reviewed upon its original release, including praise from The New York Times.

Awards
The film was nominated for four BAFTA (British Academy of Film and Television Arts) awards:
Best British Actress, Hayley Mills
Best British Film, Bryan Forbes
Best British Screenplay, Keith Waterhouse and Willis Hall
Best Film from any Source, Bryan Forbes

Box office
By September 1961 Rank were reporting the film was "exceeding expectations" commercially. The film was the 8th most popular film at the UK box office in 1961. Others popular at the time included Swiss Family Robinson, Saturday Night and Sunday Morning, Carry on Regardless, The Rebel and The Long and the Short and the Tall.

By 1971, it had earned a profit of over £240,000. Bryan Forbes later said it was the most popular and profitable film he ever made.

Musical adaptations
In 1984, rock group Toto used the plot of the movie for their music video 'Stranger in Town'. The song is on their album Isolation.

In the late 1980s, Russell Labey and Richard Taylor adapted the film into a musical of the same name for the National Youth Music Theatre.

Andrew Lloyd Webber and Jim Steinman later created a more commercial adaptation. Highlight songs from their musical version are 'Vaults of Heaven', 'Whistle Down the Wind', and 'No Matter What', which became a very successful Boyzone hit.

References

External links
 
 
 

1961 crime drama films
1961 films
British black-and-white films
British crime drama films
Films scored by Malcolm Arnold
Films based on British novels
Films directed by Bryan Forbes
Films produced by Richard Attenborough
Films set in England
Films set in Lancashire
1961 directorial debut films
1960s English-language films
1960s British films